Babbila (also spelled Bebbila) is a town in southern Syria, administratively part of the Rif Dimashq Governorate, located on the southern outskirts of Damascus to the east of the Yarmouk Camp. Nearby localities include al-Hajar al-Aswad, Jaramana, Sayyidah Zaynab, al-Sabinah and Yalda. According to the Syria Central Bureau of Statistics, Babbila had a population of 50,880 in the 2004 census. The town is also the administrative center of the Babbila nahiyah consisting of 13 towns and villages with a combined population of 341,625.

References

Populated places in Markaz Rif Dimashq District
Towns in Syria